Polyaspinus is a genus of mites in the family Trachytidae.

Species
 Polyaspinus boliviensis Hirschmann, 1992     
 Polyaspinus cylindricus Berlese, 1916     
 Polyaspinus higginsi Camin, 1954     
 Polyaspinus hutuae (Hiramatsu, 1982)     
 Polyaspinus kovaci Masan & Kaluz, 1999     
 Polyaspinus litoreus (Hiramatsu, 1980)     
 Polyaspinus marihirschmanni (Hiramatsu, 1979)     
 Polyaspinus nicolae Hirschmann, in Hirschmann & Wisniewski, 1992     
 Polyaspinus quadrangularis Athias-Binche, 1980     
 Polyaspinus schweizeri (Hutu, 1976)     
 Polyaspinus tasmanicus Bloszyk & Halliday, 2000     
 Polyaspinus tuberculatus Womersley, 1961

References

Mesostigmata
Acari genera